Adinandra is a genus of plant in the family Pentaphylacaceae. It contains the following species:

 Adinandra acuminata Korth.
 Adinandra acuta Korth.
 Adinandra angulata Ridl.
 Adinandra angustifolia (S.H.Chun ex H.G.Ye) B.M.Barthol. & T.L.Ming
 Adinandra anisobasis Kobuski
 Adinandra annamensis Gagnep. ex Kobuski
 Adinandra apoensis Elmer
 Adinandra argentifolia Sugau
 Adinandra auriformis L.K.Ling & S.X.Liang
 Adinandra bicuspidata Kobuski
 Adinandra bockiana E.Pritz. ex Diels
 Adinandra borneensis Kobuski
 Adinandra brassii Kobuski
 Adinandra brefeldii Koord.
 Adinandra calciphila Sugau
 Adinandra caudata Gagnep. ex Kobuski
 Adinandra celebica Koord.
 Adinandra clemensiae Kobuski
 Adinandra coarctata Craib
 Adinandra collettiana T.K.Paul
 Adinandra collina Kobuski
 Adinandra colombonensis Kobuski
 Adinandra cordifolia Ridl.
 Adinandra corneriana Kobuski
 Adinandra crassifolia Sugau
 Adinandra dasyantha Korth.
 Adinandra donnaiensis Gagnep. ex Kobuski
 Adinandra dubia Kobuski
 Adinandra dumosa Jack, Tiup-tiup tree
 Adinandra elegans F.C.How & W.C.Ko ex Hung T.Chang
 Adinandra elliptica C.B.Rob.
 Adinandra endertii Kobuski
 Adinandra epunctata Merr. & Chun
 Adinandra excelsa Korth.
 Adinandra eymae Kobuski
 Adinandra filipes Merr. ex Kobuski
 Adinandra forbesii Baker f.
 Adinandra formosana Hayata
 Adinandra gallatlyi R.N.Paul
 Adinandra glischroloma Hand.-Mazz.
 Adinandra grandifolia Hien & Yakovlev
 Adinandra grandis L.K.Ling
 Adinandra griffithii Dyer
 Adinandra hainanensis Hayata
 Adinandra hirta Gagnep.
 Adinandra hongiaoensis Son & L.V.Dung
 Adinandra howii Merr. & Chun
 Adinandra impressa Kobuski
 Adinandra inaequalis Sugau
 Adinandra integerrima T.Anderson ex Dyer
 Adinandra javanica Choisy
 Adinandra kamalae M.K.Pathak, Bhaumik & G.Krishna
 Adinandra kjellbergii Kobuski
 Adinandra kostermansii Sugau
 Adinandra lancipetala L.K.Ling
 Adinandra laotica Gagnep.
 Adinandra laronensis Kobuski
 Adinandra lasiopetala (Wright) Choisy
 Adinandra lasiostyla Hayata
 Adinandra latifolia L.K.Ling
 Adinandra lenticellata Sugau
 Adinandra leytensis Merr.
 Adinandra lienii Hien & Yakovlev
 Adinandra loerzingiana Kobuski
 Adinandra loheri Merr.
 Adinandra longipedicellata Sugau
 Adinandra luzonica Merr.
 Adinandra macgregorii Merr.
 Adinandra macquilingensis Merr.
 Adinandra maculosa T.Anderson ex Dyer
 Adinandra magniflora Kobuski
 Adinandra masambensis Kobuski
 Adinandra megaphylla Hu
 Adinandra mendamitensis Sugau
 Adinandra meratusensis Sugau
 Adinandra microcarpa Gagnep.
 Adinandra millettii (Hook. & Arn.) Benth. & Hook.f. ex Hance
 Adinandra myrioneura Kobuski
 Adinandra nigroglandulosa L.K.Ling
 Adinandra nigropunctata Merr.
 Adinandra nitida Merr. ex H.L.Li
 Adinandra nunkokensis Kobuski
 Adinandra oblonga Craib
 Adinandra obtusata Korth.
 Adinandra pangiensis Sugau
 Adinandra parvifolia Ridl.
 Adinandra pingbianensis L.K.Ling
 Adinandra plagiobasis Airy Shaw
 Adinandra poilanei Gagnep.
 Adinandra polyneura Kobuski
 Adinandra quinquepartita Kobuski
 Adinandra rantepaoensis Kobuski
 Adinandra retusa D.Fang & D.H.Qin
 Adinandra rubiginosa Kobuski
 Adinandra ryukyuensis Masam.
 Adinandra sadaui Sugau
 Adinandra sarosanthera Miq.
 Adinandra steenisii Kobuski
 Adinandra subauriculata Kobuski
 Adinandra subsessilis Airy Shaw
 Adinandra subunguiculata Kobuski
 Adinandra sylvestris Jacq.
 Adinandra tomentosa Sugau
 Adinandra verrucosa Stapf
 Adinandra villosa Choisy
 Adinandra yaeyamensis Ohwi

References

 
Ericales genera
Taxonomy articles created by Polbot